Hugo Gutiérrez may refer to:
 Hugo Gutiérrez (footballer), Argentine footballer
 Hugo Gutiérrez Gálvez, Chilean politician
 Hugo Gutiérrez Vega, Mexican poet, lawyer, writer and academic
 Hugo Gutierrez Jr., Filipino jurist and civil liberties advocate